The Chairman's Trophy is a Group 2 set weights Thoroughbred horse race in Hong Kong, run at Sha Tin over a distance of 1600 metres, and takes place in early April. Horses three years old and older are qualified to enter this race.

Winners

See also
 List of Hong Kong horse races

References
Racing Post:
 , 
 Racing Information of Chairman's Trophy (2011/12)
 The Hong Kong Jockey Club 

Horse races in Hong Kong